Luoxi Island is an island in Luopu Subdistrict, Panyu District, Guangzhou City, Guangdong Province, China. It is located in the northeast of Nanpu Island to the south of Haizhu Island and to the west of Xiaoguwei Island.

Luoxi Bridge was the first toll road built in China, when Hong Kong tycoon Henry Fok invested into this bridge in his native Guangdong Province.

References

Panyu District
Islands of Guangzhou